Ferral is a freguesia (civil parish) in the municipality of Montalegre, Vila Real District, Portugal.

In 2011, it contained 397 inhabitants; population density, 25.1 inhabitants/km2.

Freguesias of Montalegre